Melih Kotanca (1915 – 1986) was a Turkish footballer and track and field athlete.

He was twice winner at the Balkan Athletics Championships, taking the 200 metres title in 1939 and the 400 metres title in 1940.

References

Profile at mackolik.com

1915 births
1966 deaths
Sportspeople from Balıkesir
Turkish footballers
Association football forwards
Turkish male sprinters
Turkish male hurdlers
Turkish male javelin throwers
Turkish decathletes
Fenerbahçe S.K. footballers
Balkan Athletics Championships winners
20th-century Turkish people